National Geographic Institute may refer to:

 National Geographic Institute (Belgium)
 National Geographic Institute (France)
 National Geographic Institute of Guatemala
 National Geographic Institute (Spain)

See also
 National mapping agency, including a list of agencies
 IGN (disambiguation)